The Powhatan are a Native American tribe.

Powhatan or Powhattan may also refer to:

Places in the United States 
 Powhatan, Arkansas, a town in Lawrence County
 Powhatan Historic State Park, Lawrence County, Arkansas
 Powhattan Township, Brown County, Kansas
 Powhattan, Kansas, a city
 Powhatan, Louisiana, a village
 Powhatan, North Carolina, an unincorporated community
 Powhattan, Ohio, an unincorporated community
 Powhatan County, Virginia
 Powhatan, Virginia, a census-designated place and county seat
 Powhatan Rural Historic District, near King George, King George County, Virginia, on the National Register of Historic Places
 Fort Powhatan, near Garysville, Virginia, built during the Revolutionary War and abandoned after the Civil War
 Powhatan, West Virginia, an unincorporated community

People 
 Powhatan (given name)
 Powhatan (Native American leader) (1545–1618), leader of the Powhatan tribe and father of Pocahontas

Ships 
 , six United States Navy ships
 Powhatan-class tugboat, a United States Navy class
 Powhattan (1837), a ship transporting emigrants which sank in 1854 with the loss of all aboard

Other uses 
 Powhatan language, an extinct Algonquian language
 Powhatan Apartments, a Chicago landmark
 Powhatan (Five Forks, Virginia), a home on the National Register of Historic Places
 Hotel Powhatan (opened 1891), later the Powhatan College for Young Women (1900–1913), Ranson, West Virginia
 Powhatan High School, Powhatan County, Virginia

See also 
Powhatan Point, Ohio, a village
Powhatan Arrow, a train